The Province of the Anglican Church of Burundi (French: Province de l'Église anglicane du Burundi) is a province of the Anglican Communion, located in East Africa between Tanzania, Rwanda, Kenya, and the Congo. The Archbishop and Primate of Burundi is Sixbert Macumi.

History
After the first missionary work, the first Anglican structures in Burundi were established around 1935 and grew rapidly. The former Ruanda Mission set up its first mission stations at Buhiga and Matana in 1935, and Buye in 1936. There was much growth through medical work and education. Metropolitical authority came from the Archbishop of Canterbury until in 1965 the 'Province of Uganda, Rwanda, Burundi, and Boga-Zaire' was established, and the first national bishop was consecrated for the Diocese of Buye (covering the whole country).

Following expansion, Uganda became an independent province, leaving the  rest of the region as the new Province of Rwanda, Burundi, and Boga-Zaire. In 1975, Buye diocese was divided into two and the Diocese of Bujumbura was created. The Diocese of Gitega came into existence in 1985, followed by the Diocese of Matana in 1990. The most recent diocese to be created was the Diocese of Rumonge, created from the southern part of the Diocese of Bujumbura and comprising around 50 parishes. Their first bishop elected was Pedaculi Birakengana, with the official inauguration of the diocese taking place on 4 August 2013.

In 1992 the three countries of the Province each gained independence under their own individual Metropolitan Archbishop. The Episcopal Church of Burundi had his first Primate in Samuel Sindamuka, who would be in office until 1998. He was followed by Samuel Ndayisenga, Primate from 1998 to 2005. In Burundi expansion continued, with Makamba diocese established in 1997 and Muyinga in 2005. Finally in 2005 the Province adopted the current name. Archbishop Bernard Ntahoturi was elected Primate the same year and reelected in 2010.

Official name
The name of the Province of the Episcopal Church of Burundi changed to the Province of the Anglican Church of Burundi (Province de l’Eglise Anglicane du Burundi) as the result of a decision taken at the Provincial Synod held in Bujumbura, March 2005.

Membership
There are approximately 900,000 Anglicans in an estimated population of 12 million in Burundi.

Structure
The polity of the Anglican Church of Burundi is Episcopalian church governance, which is the same as other Anglican churches. The church maintains a system of geographical parishes organized into dioceses. The spiritual head of the province is its Archbishop, who is Ordinary of one of the dioceses, Metropolitan of the Province, and Primate. There are currently nine dioceses, each headed by a bishop:
See Anglican dioceses of Burundi

Archbishop of Burundi
The Archbishop of Burundi is both Metropolitan and Primate; he retains his diocesan See along with the Primacy. The holders of the office have been:

Samuel Sindamuka, 1992–1998
Samuel Ndayisenga, 1998–2005
Bernard Ntahoturi, 2005–2016
Martin Nyaboho, 2016–2021
Sixbert Macumi; 2021-

Worship and liturgy
The Anglican Church of Burundi embraces three orders of ministry: deacon, priest, and bishop. A local variant of the Book of Common Prayer is used.

Doctrine and practice

The center of the Anglican Church of Burundi's teaching is the life and resurrection of Jesus Christ. The basic teachings of the church, or catechism, includes:
Jesus Christ is fully human and fully God. He died and was resurrected from the dead. 
Jesus provides the way of eternal life for those who believe.
The Old and New Testaments of the Bible were written by people "under the inspiration of the Holy Spirit".  The Apocrypha are additional books that are used in Christian worship, but not for the formation of doctrine.
The two great and necessary sacraments are Holy Baptism and Holy Eucharist
Other sacramental rites are confirmation, ordination, marriage, reconciliation of a penitent, and unction. 
Belief in heaven, hell, and Jesus's return in glory.

The threefold sources of authority in Anglicanism are scripture, tradition, and reason. These three sources uphold and critique each other in a dynamic way. This balance of scripture, tradition and reason is traced to the work of Richard Hooker, a sixteenth-century apologist. In Hooker's model, scripture is the primary means of arriving at doctrine and things stated plainly in scripture are accepted as true. Issues that are ambiguous are determined by tradition, which is checked by reason (on how scripture, tradition, and reason work to "uphold and critique each other in a dynamic way").

Social issues
The Church's major concerns include peace and reconciliation, repatriation of refugees and displaced people, community development, literacy and education, and fighting AIDS. It is committed to mission and evangelism and is concerned to support theological education and training for ministry.

Ecumenical relations
Unlike other Anglican churches, the Anglican Church of Burundi is not a member of many ecumenical bodies. The Church is not a member of the World Council of Churches.

Anglican realignment
The Anglican Church of Burundi is a member of the Global South but hasn't been very active so far in the Anglican realignment. Archbishop Bernard Ntahoturi attended GAFCON II, that took place in Nairobi, Kenya, from 21 to 26 October 2013. The province was represented at GAFCON III, held in Jerusalem, on 17-22 June 2018, by a single delegate. The leading name of the GAFCON in the province is Bishop Seth Ndayirukye, of the Diocese of Matana. Four bishops of the Anglican Church of Burundi attended the GAFCON Training Bishops Institute in May 2019.

References

Further reading
Anglicanism, Neill, Stephen. Harmondsworth, 1965.

External links

Province of the Anglican Church of Burundi at Anglican Communion Official Website

Anglican realignment denominations
Burundi
Anglicanism in Burundi
1992 establishments in Burundi